Mark Bolton (born 3 April 1979) is a retired Australian rules footballer.

He was recruited to Essendon with pick 4 in the 1997 National Draft, via Ringwood, Victoria and Eastern U18. He made his debut in 1998 and went on to play 124 games.

He announced his retirement at the 2007 Crichton Medal Count.

Bolton completed his secondary education at Ringwood Secondary College and continued on to complete a Bachelor of Science (Biomedical Science) at Swinburne University of Technology.

Bolton joined University Blacks for season 2010.

Bolton is now, in 2011, the executive director of Ladder, a non-governmental organisation that enables homeless youth to find housing, jobs and pursue meaningful lives.

References

1979 births
Place of birth missing (living people)
Living people
Essendon Football Club players
Swinburne University of Technology alumni
Australian rules footballers from Victoria (Australia)
Eastern Ranges players
University Blacks Football Club players